Madame Sans-Gêne (Madame Careless) is a 1925 American silent romantic costume comedy-drama film directed by Léonce Perret and starring Gloria Swanson. Based on the play of the same name by Victorien Sardou and Émile Moreau, the film was released by Paramount Pictures.

Plot
As described in a film magazine review, at the time after the French Revolution, a sharp witted laundress fights for her country and wins favor with a Duke. After her marriage to him, she is accepted in the court of Napoleon. Because her manners are not fashionable, she is called before Napoleon. She triumphs over the court with her wits and returns to her husband, whom she loves.

Cast

Production
The film was produced and filmed in France, as Swanson was on extended vacation there. She soon became involved with Henri de La Falaise, hired by Paramount to be her French interpreter, and who later became her third husband.

Preservation
With no prints of Madame Sans-Gêne located in any film archives, it is a lost film.  A vintage movie trailer displaying short clips of the film still exists, however, and can be seen on YouTube.

See also
List of lost films
List of Paramount Pictures films

References

External links

Film poster of Madame Sans-Gêne
Film poster and New York Times review
 Still of Swanson during the production
Film poster

1925 films
1925 romantic comedy films
American romantic comedy films
American silent feature films
American black-and-white films
Depictions of Napoleon on film
Famous Players-Lasky films
American films based on plays
Films based on works by Victorien Sardou
Films set in the 18th century
Films shot in France
Lost American films
Paramount Pictures films
1925 lost films
Lost romantic comedy films
Films directed by Léonce Perret
1920s American films
Silent romantic comedy films
Silent American comedy films
1920s English-language films